As of July 2022, the United States Collegiate Athletic Association (USCAA) has 72 member institutions from 21 states for competition in college athletics.

See also
List of NCAA Division I institutions
List of NCAA Division II institutions
List of NCAA Division III institutions
List of NAIA institutions
List of NCCAA institutions
List of NJCAA Division I schools
List of NJCAA Division II schools
List of NJCAA Division III schools

References

External links 
 USCAA Members

 
USCAA
USCAA institutions